Batman: The Long Halloween is a 2021 American two-part animated direct-to-video superhero film produced by Warner Bros. Animation and DC Entertainment, based on the DC Comics storyline of the same name. It is the 42nd film of the DC Universe Animated Original Movies, with both parts serving as the third and fourth installments of the Tomorrowverse. The film is directed by Chris Palmer and stars the voices of Jensen Ackles, Naya Rivera, Josh Duhamel, Billy Burke, Titus Welliver, David Dastmalchian, Troy Baker, Amy Landecker, Julie Nathanson, Jack Quaid, Fred Tatasciore and Alastair Duncan. The film is dedicated to Rivera, as it was her final film role before her death in 2020. In both parts of the film, Batman attempts to unravel the mystery of murders committed on holidays throughout the year, and uncover the true identity of the serial killer Holiday. 

Part 1 was released on June 27, 2021, and Part 2 was released on July 27 the same year. A deluxe edition combining both films was released on September 20, 2022.

Plot

Part One
On Halloween, Johnny Viti, nephew of Gotham City mob boss Carmine "The Roman" Falcone, is murdered by a mysterious figure who leaves a jack-o'-lantern at the crime scene. Since Viti was about to turn the state's evidence against Falcone, Gotham City Police Department Captain James Gordon suspects Carmine himself of being responsible. He summons District Attorney Harvey Dent and Batman to investigate the murder and bring down Falcone.

Catwoman leads Batman to Falcone's cash stockpile with Dent following. Based on a coin flip, Harvey decides to burn the money rather than move it legally and risk Falcone stopping them. In retaliation, Falcone hires triad member Mickey Chen to bomb Harvey's house. Both Harvey and his wife Gilda survive, but Harvey is hospitalized. Batman chases Chen down to the sewers, where he runs into Solomon Grundy. Batman convinces Grundy to spare Chen and takes him to the GCPD for questioning. Lacking evidence of his involvement in the bombing, Batman and Gordon are forced to release him. Gordon advises Batman to learn more about being a detective.

On Thanksgiving, Falcone's son Alberto sends Harvey a mocking "get well soon" card in his father's name, angering Falcone for presuming to speak for him. Falcone strangles his son and reminds him that he is too weak to inherit the family business. Harvey escapes from the hospital and meets Gordon, who gives him a gun for protection. That night, Chen and his associates are killed by Viti's murderer. On Christmas Eve, Gordon and Batman question Calendar Man in Arkham Asylum on the identity of the murderer who has now been nicknamed "Holiday". Calendar Man names Falcone, Sal Maroni, and Harvey as suspects and calls Batman's war on crime a "joke". 

Batman then realizes that Joker has escaped from Arkham. Not wanting Holiday to replace him as Gotham's most notorious criminal, Joker confronts Harvey in his home and threatens to kill Gilda if he is proven to be Holiday. Batman visits Maroni, who was also attacked by Joker. Maroni advises Batman that if Joker is on Holiday, he will inevitably target Falcone himself. Joker harasses Falcone, warning him not to divulge any new information about Holiday to him. Falcone's bodyguard Milos Grappa chases Joker out of the building but is killed by Holiday. In the Batcave, Batman identifies Maroni, Falcone's sister Carla Viti, Joker, Falcone, and Harvey as suspects. Batman gives Harvey Dent the benefit of the doubt based on the fact that although He is obsessed with taking down the Falcone and Maroni Crime Families, Dent was denied a pistol permit due to a psychiatric evaluation of wild aberrations and doesn't own a gun.

Bruce Wayne attends a New Year's Eve yacht party celebrating Gotham's children's clinic, hosted by Falcone, who calls out Bruce during his speech as the son he never had, angering Alberto. Bruce meets with Selina Kyle, who calls off their relationship due to their conflicting secret identities. Joker attempts to gas the New Year's Eve celebration in Gotham Square using a stolen plane, hoping that Holiday is among the crowd. Meanwhile, Selina meets with Alberto to learn about the Falcone family. Alberto laments about never being respected by his father, who also rejected his fiancée from Oxford University. Batman foils Joker's scheme, and when Joker remarks that he "loves a good puzzle", Batman deduces that Alberto, who would benefit the most from killing his father's enemies and is known for his love of puzzles, is the killer. Returning to the yacht, Batman accuses Alberto of being Holiday, targeting his father's associates to gain power within the family. Alberto angrily denies wanting control of the family business, citing he no longer wishes to be in his father's shadow. As the New Year starts, Alberto is shot dead by Holiday and falls into the water, where his body is cut to pieces by the yacht's propellers. Batman pursues Holiday, but the killer manages to escape via speedboat. As the ship is evacuated, Gordon and Harvey meet with Batman. Batman tells his allies to assign a protective detail to Falcone.
  
In a post-credits scene, Bruce attends Alberto's funeral. Falcone approaches him and requests Bruce's help in money laundering his money, but Bruce refuses. Bruce is then introduced to the woman accompanying Falcone, who shakes his hand. Vines emerge from under her sleeve to grip Bruce's arm, turning his eyes green, indicating that Poison Ivy has taken control of him.

Part Two
In the three months since Alberto's death, the Holiday killer has targeted the Falcone and Maroni families on Valentine's Day, Saint Patrick's Day, and April Fools' Day. Meanwhile, Bruce has signed much of his assets over to Falcone under Poison Ivy's influence. Catwoman defeats Ivy and rescues Bruce.

On Mother's Day, a teahouse in Gotham's Chinatown was reviled to be a front for a black market for stolen guns and the murdered owner Chong was suppling firearms to Holiday. Scarecrow escapes from Arkham Asylum. When Batman intervenes, Scarecrow injects him with his fear toxin, forcing him to relive the night of his parent's murder. Catwoman finds Batman in an alleyway and brings him home. Falcone's daughter Sofia asks for a seat at the family table, but Falcone refuses. Gordon and Harvey question Bruce about Holiday, citing his family's past connections with Falcone. Bruce recalls how, as a boy, he met Falcone when his father saved his life following an assassination attempt by the Maronis.

On Father's Day, Maroni's father Luigi is murdered by Holiday. Catwoman witnesses Falcone paying a hitman in the cemetery. Maroni meets with Harvey and agrees to testify against Falcone in exchange for immunity. On the Fourth of July, Batman is captured by Scarecrow and Mad Hatter as they rob a bank for Falcone. He escapes and defeats them as they drop off the cash in the cemetery. On the boardwalk, Falcone's hitman attacks Harvey and Gilda during the fireworks display. Catwoman intervenes, but the hitman knocks out both of them. Harvey awakens to find the hitman dead and one of Holiday's guns nearby, and he flees as the police arrive.

Falcone's sister Carla Viti publicly accuses Harvey of being Holiday. While Harvey has Maroni in court, Batman meets Gordon and reveals that he found Holiday's guns in the Dents' basement and an Oxford University Pennant. In the middle of the court, Maroni accuses Harvey of being Holiday and throws acid in his face. Harvey is hospitalized, but escapes and is picked up by Falcone's men. Harvey realizes it's a trap and the two men are here to kill him for Johnny and Alberto's death. Harvey kills his guards and flees into the sewers, where he is nurtured by Solomon Grundy. On Falcone's birthday, Carla is killed by Holiday.

On Labor Day, Harvey and Grundy attack Maroni's prison convoy. Batman, disguised as Maroni's guard, subdues Grundy, but Maroni is shot by Holiday from another building. Harvey, Grundy, and Holiday escape. At Wayne Manor, Alfred prepares for another Halloween while Bruce questions his motives for fighting crime. Alfred reassures him that, regardless of his parents' connections to the mob, they would have been proud of him. Batman asks Catwoman about her obsession with the Falcone family. She confesses that Falcone is her father, and she only wants to know her mother's name. Harvey, now calling himself Two-Face, and Grundy attacks Arkham and free several inmates; Poison Ivy, Scarecrow, and Mad Hatter engage the GCPD while Two-Face, Grundy, Joker, and Penguin attack Falcone's building. 

They overwhelm Falcone's guards and Sofia, and Two-Face prepares to flip a coin to decide whether Falcone will live or die. Batman and Catwoman arrive and defeat the rogues but are unable to prevent Two-Face from shooting Falcone. Distraught, Sofia falls out the broken window to her death. Catwoman reveals her face to Falcone, who says "Louisa" before dying in Batman's arms. Two-Face turns himself over to Gordon and claims responsibility for all the Holiday killings. In the Dents' basement, Gilda burns her Holiday items while Batman looks on. Harvey Dent was a Gotham University graduate, but Glida went to Oxford at the same time Alberto went. She confesses that Falcone had annulled her marriage to Alberto and had their child aborted, rendering her infertile because Carmine would not allow a child born out of wedlock into the family and Alberto was made a disgrace. Later on, she moved to Gotham and married Harvey with hope that he and the law would bring down the Roman but numerous failed attempts drove her to become a vigilante. As Holiday, she exacted revenge against the entire family and killing Alberto and the Maroni Family was a bonus to eradicate any connection to her past and throw suspicion off of her and Harvey because in the end she still loved him. Gilda asks Batman how he figured out it was her and he responded that when she killed Maroni and Two-Face prevented him from pursuing reviled Dent figured it out when he found out about the guns in the basement that he knew nothing about, and the way he was willing to take the fall for her. She assures Batman that Holiday is finished and she asks would he tell Gordon, but he doesn't answer and leaves.

On Halloween, Alfred, with a bowl of chocolates in his hands, holds out hope for trick-or-treaters. Bruce predicts that there will be no visitors. Wayne Manor then receives its first trick-or-treater. Selina is revealed to be together with Bruce and mocks Bruce's previously expressed skepticism. Alfred opens the door to a child dressed as Batman. In a post-credits scene, the doorbell again rings, and Alfred opens the door to Flash and Green Arrow and informs Bruce of their arrival.

Cast

Appearing in both parts
 Jensen Ackles as Bruce Wayne / Batman
 Zach Callison as Young Bruce Wayne
 Josh Duhamel as Harvey Dent / Two-Face
 Billy Burke as Commissioner Gordon
 Naya Rivera as Selina Kyle / Catwoman
 Alastair Duncan as Alfred Pennyworth
 Troy Baker as Joker, Antoni
 David Dastmalchian as Julian Day / Calendar Man, Oswald Cobblepot / Penguin
 Amy Landecker as Barbara Gordon, Carla Viti
 Julie Nathanson as Gilda Dent
 Gary LeRoi Gray as Officer Pearce
 Fred Tatasciore as Solomon Grundy, Large Triad, Vincent Falcone
 Jim Pirri as Sal Maroni, Arkham Guard
 Titus Welliver as Carmine Falcone, Luigi Maroni

Appearing in Part One
 Frances Callier as Nurse Tamara
 Greg Chun as Mickey Chen
 Jack Quaid as Alberto Falcone

Appearing in Part Two
 Laila Berzins as Sofia Falcone
 Alyssa Diaz as Renee Montoya
 John DiMaggio as Jervis Tetch / Mad Hatter
 Robin Atkin Downes as Dr. Jonathan Crane / Scarecrow, Thomas Wayne
 Katee Sackhoff as Dr. Pamela Isley / Poison Ivy
 Rick D. Wasserman as Bodyguard

The Flash and Green Arrow make non-speaking cameo appearances during the second part's post-credit scene.

Production
The film was officially announced in August 2020, during the Superman: Man of Tomorrow panel at DC FanDome.

Release
Part One was released on June 22, 2021, on digital download, DVD, and Blu-ray. Part One was delayed due to the release of the live-action Batman film The Batman, and was originally supposed to launch the new animated continuity that originated in Superman: Man of Tomorrow.

Part Two was made available for online streaming on July 27, and was released on DVD and Blu-ray on August 10.

The deluxe edition released in September 2022 combined the two parts into one.

Reception

Jesse Schedeen of IGN rated Part One an 8 out of 10: "Batman: The Long Halloween, Part One may not quite meet the high standard of Justice Society: World War II, but it's a well-crafted addition to the revamped DC Universe Movies line. It faithfully adapts the comic book source material while still veering in its own direction at times. It's difficult to imagine this adaptation working nearly as well if Warner Bros. Animation had tried to cram the entirety of The Long Halloween into one movie. With any luck, Part Two will be just as successful".

Zaki Hasan of IGN rated Part Two a 9 out of 10: "It's a compelling story adapted with care and performed with conviction. Taken together, both parts make for not merely one of the best Batman animated movies, but one of the best Batman movies, period".

William Fischer of Collider negatively compared the film's visual design to the more detailed and stylized artwork of the comics story arc, while acknowledging that the film's animators worked under different constraints than illustrators.

Part One earned $659,774 from domestic DVD sales and $2,950,796 from domestic Blu-ray sales, bringing its total domestic home video earnings to $3,610,570. Part Two earned $454,659 from domestic DVD sales and $2,100,180 from domestic Blu-ray sales, bringing its total domestic home video earnings to $2,554,839.

Future

Ackles reprised his role as Bruce Wayne / Batman in Legion of Super-Heroes, which is also set in the Tomorrowverse.

Notes

References

External links
 
 
 

2020s American animated films
2020s direct-to-video animated superhero films
2020s English-language films
2020s superhero films
2021 animated films
2021 direct-to-video films
Animated action films
American adult animated films
American serial killer films
Animated Batman films
DC Universe Animated Original Movies
American films about Halloween
Films released in separate parts
Tomorrowverse